Cold Blood, also known as Cold Blood Legacy, is a 2019 action thriller film written and directed by Frédéric Petitjean and starring Jean Reno, Sarah Lind, Joe Anderson and Samantha Bond. It was released on 15 May 2019.

Plot
When a retired killer finds a critically injured girl near his isolated lakeside home, he risks either blowing his cover to help the girl or leaving her to die.

Cast
Jean Reno as Henry
Sarah Lind as Charlie
Joe Anderson as Kappa
David Gyasi as Malcolm
Ihor Ciszkewycz as Davies
François Guétary as Brigleur
Samantha Bond as Mrs Kessler
Jean-Luc Olivier as Mr Kessler
Larisa Rusnak as Katy

Reception
The film received generally negative reviews. Variety called Cold Blood "instantly forgettable", The Observer named it a "boring thriller" while The Hollywood Reporter said that despite the film featuring a "a breathtaking snow-covered setting" and being "well shot", the "result is a film that’s as nonsensical as it is blandly put together".

References

External links
 

2019 films
2010s English-language films
2010s French films